The 1934 South Dakota State Jackrabbits football team was an American football team that represented South Dakota State University in the North Central Conference (NCC) during the 1934 college football season. In its first season under head coach Red Threlfall, the team compiled a 6–4 record and outscored opponents by a total of 189 to 72.

Halfback Paul Miller led the team with 116 points scored.

Schedule

References

South Dakota State
South Dakota State Jackrabbits football seasons
South Dakota State Jackrabbits football